Hoiio is a cloud company providing modular software services to businesses on a subscription and usage based model.

They have expanded regionally with offices in Singapore, Malaysia, Hong Kong and Vietnam.

Corporate Profile
Launched in 2012, Hoiio began as a cloud communication service provider but over time, expanded  to include compliance, marketing and human resource management.

As of March 2015, Hoiio has invested US3.3 million into the research and development of cloud technologies and Hoiio apps engine.

Technology
The apps operate on a Software as a Service business model and users are charged for usage of Voice, SMS and Numbers as well as app subscriptions.

References 

Application programming interfaces
VoIP companies
Cloud communication platforms